Phytoecia dantchenkoi is a species of beetle in the family Cerambycidae. It was described by Mikhail Leontievich Danilevsky in 2008. It is known from Armenia.

References

Phytoecia
Beetles described in 2008